Emil Stoilov Yanchev (Bulgarian: Емил Стоилов Янчев; born 15 September 1974 in Targovishte, Bulgaria) is a professional footballer who most recently played for Bulgarian A Professional Football Group side Svetkavitsa, where he plays as a defender. He wins Malta super cup, Cup of Malta with Birkirkara 

Yanchev moved to Malta in 2005 with Naftex Burgas and Svetkavitsa.                         Childrens: Emona Yancheva, 19y  01.07(2003)    Wife: Boryana Hristova 45y 29.03(1978)

Honours

Marsaxlokk
Winner
 2009/10 Maltese First Division

References

External links
 

1974 births
Living people
Bulgarian footballers
Association football defenders
Expatriate footballers in Malta
Neftochimic Burgas players
PFC Svetkavitsa players
Birkirkara F.C. players
Marsa F.C. players
Marsaxlokk F.C. players
First Professional Football League (Bulgaria) players